Corduroy is a Canadian animated children's television series based on Don Freeman's 1968 children's book Corduroy and its 1978 follow-up A Pocket for Corduroy. It originally aired for one season on TVOKids in Canada and PBS Kids' Bookworm Bunch in the U.S. in 2000. After the final episode, reruns were aired until October 28, 2001 (where it got cancelled along with Elliot Moose). The show consists of 26 10-minute stories, which were broadcast in pairs as 13 21-minute episodes.

Overview
The story is set in New York City and follows the teddy bear Corduroy (whose personality is similar to a preschool child) and his best friend Lisa, an American schoolgirl of Jamaican heritage. Lisa lived with her mother in an unnamed big city. Corduroy's toy companions are Buckaroo the rocking horse and Rosetta the wind-up mouse (whose personalities --like Corduroy-- are also similar to a preschool child). All Corduroy episodes were officially released onto YouTube in April 2013 on Treehouse TV's channel.

Voice cast and characters
Adapted from end credits:
Asa Perlman as Corduroy, Lisa's teddy bear
Alisha Morrison (credited as Alesha Morrison) as Lisa, Corduroy's owner and friend
Camille James as Lisa's Mom
Diane Fabian as Rosetta, a French wind-up mouse
Len Carlson as Buckaroo, the rocking horse
Jake Goldsbie as Marty "Moppy", Lisa's friend and the main character from Don Freeman's book, Mop Top
Uncredited:
Tony Daniels as Lisa's Dad
Camille James as Mrs. Chau, a kind-hearted Chinese lady who takes care of flowers and has a pet cat named Kit.
Marnie McPhail as Moppy's mother
Philip Williams as Greengrocer Man (Yours, Mine and Ours/Finders Keepers)
Noah Reid as Greengrocer Boy (Yours, Mine and Ours/Finders Keepers)
Keith Knight as Dinosaurs (1 + 1 = 2)
Annick Obonsawin as Brown-haired boy (wearing a red school uniform) (Super Duper Market)

Crew
Adapted from end credits:

Executive producers: Michael Hirsh, Patrick Loubert, Clive A. Smith, Tony Hwang, Lin Oliver, Stuart Benjamin, Alise Benjamin
Supervising producers: Stephen Hodgins, Jocelyn Hamilton, Patricia R. Burns
Line producer: Marika Kocaba
Associate producer: Blair Peters
Director: Eduardo Soriano
Assistant director: Lyn Hart
Post-production director: Laura Shepherd
Story editor and developer: Betty Quan
Voice casting director: Deb Toffan
Casting administrator: Karyn Tester
Casting co-ordinator: Christine Geddes
Casting assistant: Carrie Justason
Recording assistants: Kerry Bones, Edmond Chan
Production supervisor: Ruta Cube
Production managers: Judy Leung, Sauching Ng
Production co-ordinators: Nancy Graham, Wendy Courtney
Production assistant: Stephen Lategan
Script co-ordinator: Karen Moonah
Storyboard artists: Paul Dedi, Dave Mah, Ken Davis, Trent Larson, Samuel To, Don Boone, John Delaney, Marvin Tabo Estropia
Storyboard clean-up artists: Sherwin Macario, Tobias Anker, Kiyoshi Kohatsu, Jenny Haskins, David Ian Philip
Storyboard co-ordinator: Allan Parker
Designers: Bernard Lizon, Dave Walters, Lil Reichmann, Dan Hughes, Meagan Brown, Ryan Heshka, Stuart Wenschlag, Dallas Parker
Design clean-up: Mary Leier, Victoria Goldner, John Beveridge
F/X designer: James M. Clow
Design co-ordinator: Athena Cho
Background artists: Peter Mong, Jamie Tainton, Susan Erlich
Colour stylist: Tara Miller

Director's notes: Mars Cabrera, Sherann Johnson
Lip sync: Cathy Parkes, Cathy Luker
Layout supervisor: Chris Minz
Animation supervisor: Greg Woods
Pre-production supervisors: Liza Wespi, Robert Watts
Pre-production editing: Jodi Reichmuth, Chad Van De Keere, Joli Rogers
Pre-production assistant: Mike Thorpe
Pre-production sound: Dick & Roger's Sound Studio
Dialogue assembly: Ken Lomas, Alex Verdecchia
Pre-production checker: Steve MacVittie
Director post-production: Rob Kirkpatrick
G.M. post-production: Joe Scrivo
Post-production manager: Nancy E. Black
Post audio supervisor: Steven Cole
Post-production administrator: Ann McGuire
Post-production co-ordinator: Brian Marsh
Post-production assistants: Chris Stearman, Michael Goldsmith, Joey Aguiar
Picture editor: Simon Marcroft
Assistant picture editor: Mike Goodings
Online editor: Andy Hunter
Mixer: John Carey
Theme: Ray Parker, Tom Szczesniak
Music: Amin Bhatia
Music supervisor: Stephen Hudecki
Music assistant: Helena Werren
Music editor: Steve Shelski
Dialogue editor: Simon Giles
Sound effect editors: Steve Gardner, Taissa Prychodko
Business & legal affairs: Suzanne L. Cross
Educational consultant: Miki Baumgarten

Episodes

Broadcasting

Canada: TVOKids, Treehouse TV
U.S.: PBS Kids
Brazil: Futura
Italy: Disney Channel, JimJam
Poland: MiniMax, MiniMini+, KidsCo
Portugal: KidsCo
Australia: Nick Jr.
United Kingdom: Tiny Pop
Latin America: Cartoon Network
South Africa: K-T.V.

References

External links

Corduroy on YouTube

Treehouse TV original programming
TVO original programming
PBS original programming
PBS Kids shows
Television series by Nelvana
Canadian preschool education television series
Canadian children's animated comedy television series
Canadian children's animated fantasy television series
Animated preschool education television series
2000s preschool education television series
2000 Canadian television series debuts
2001 Canadian television series endings
2000s Canadian animated television series
2000s Canadian children's television series
2000 Chinese television series debuts
2001 Chinese television series endings
Chinese children's animated comedy television series
Chinese children's animated fantasy television series
Canadian television shows based on children's books
English-language television shows
Animated television series about children
Animated television series about bears
Animated television series about horses
Animated television series about mice and rats
Television shows set in New York City